Peter Paul Alexander von Baranoff (tr. ; 22 December 1924) was a Baltic German military officer and statesman. During the First World War, Baranoff was known for his investigations, most notably his investigation of fellow general Paul von Rennenkampf's actions during the Battle of Łódź.

Biography

Origin 

Peter was from the Baltic German and Swedish noble  of Swedish and Russian descent. The Baranoffs was originally Russian boyar who entered Swedish service after Estonia was ceased to the Swedish under the conclusion of the Treaty of Teusina at the end of the Russo-Swedish War From 1590 to 1595. And many of them, quickly adapted to the Germanic traditions, converted to Lutheranism, and quickly became Baltic German subjects, including the Baranoffs, which was headed by four brothers: Voin, Fyodor, Kasyan and Menshik Baranov, which they changed their surname from Baranov to Baranoff to be better suited into Germanic name. The descendants of Voin and Fyodor quickly died out in the late-17th Century, while the descendants of Kasyan survived they died out in the late-19th Century, but the descendants of Menshik, which Peter was directly descended from, are still surviving til today. The family was enrolled into Swedish nobility in 1666. In 1745, the Estonian high count gave an appeal the "Attestatum nobilitaris", that under the conclusion "that from 1592 on the Baranoff family was to be brought under local nobility". So the family was enrolled into the Estonian Knighthood that same year, the family was also enrolled into the Livonian and Oesel Knighthoods (de) following the years 1830 and 1843 simultaneously.

Peter belonged to the Arroküll-Waetz branch, a subdivided branch of the family founded by Peter's great-grandfather Peter Karl von Baranoff, who was married to Johanna Juliane von Hastfer (de). Some of the most famous members of the Baranoffs also belonged to this branch, including Peter's uncles Johann , Nikolai , Paul von Baranoff , who were all high-ranked Russian military officers and statesmans.

On his mother's side was the Nicolays, his mother's father was Paul von Nicolay , who was the son of the famous German poet Ludwig Heinrich von Nicolay, making Peter von Baranoff the great-grandson of him.

Family 
Baranoff has 4 siblings. He himself was married to Olga Valerianovna Bibikova (1846-1933), they had 2 children, Olga (1883-1972) and Peter von Baranoff (1885-1973), who was a captain in the army and participant of the First World War.

Honours and awards

Domestic 
  Order of St. Anna, 4th class (1863)
  Order of St. Anna, 3rd class (1872)
  Golden Weapon "For Bravery" (11.4.1878)
  Order of St Vladimir, 4th class with swords and a bow (1878)
  Order of St. Stanislaus, 2nd class with swords (1878)
  Order of St. Anna, 2nd class (1881)
  Order of St Vladimir, 3rd class (1886)
  Order of St. Stanislaus, 1st class (1894)
  Order of St. Anna, 1st class (1898)
  Order of St Vladimir, 2nd class (1905)
  Order of the White Eagle (1907)
  Order of St. Alexander Nevsky with diamond marks (16.6.1911, diamond marks on 6.12.1915)

Foreign 
 :
  Order of Franz Joseph, Knight class (1874)
  Order of the Iron Crown (Austria), Knight first class (1897)
 :
  Cross "For crossing the Danube" (ru) (1877)
 :
  Order of the Red Eagle, 2nd class (1881)
  Order of the Crown, 1st class (1898)
  Grand Duchy of Mecklenburg-Schwerin:
  Order of the Griffon

References

Sources 
 Russian army in the Great War: Card file of the project: Baranov, Pyotr Petrovich
 Welding, Olaf. Baltic German Biographical Dictionary 1710-1960. (1970), from the Baltic Biographical Dictionary Digital 
 Klingspor, Carl Arvid. Baltic heraldic coat of arms all, belonging to the knighthoods of Livonia, Estonia, Courland and Oesel noble families. Stockholm (1882)
 Stackelberg, Otto Magnus v. Genealogical Handbook of the Estonian Knighthood, Vol. 1. Görlitz (1931)

1843 births
1924 deaths
Baltic-German people
Military leaders of the Russian Empire